Christensen was a racing car constructor. Christensen cars competed in two rounds of the FIA World Championship - the 1959 and 1960 Indianapolis 500 races.

World Championship Indy 500 results

Formula One constructors (Indianapolis only)
American racecar constructors